Glossolepis is a genus of rainbowfishes from New Guinea.

Species
There are currently nine recognized species in this genus:
 Glossolepis dorityi G. R. Allen, 2001 (Doritys rainbowfish)
 Glossolepis incisus M. C. W. Weber, 1907 (Red rainbowfish)
 Glossolepis kabia (Herre, 1935)
 Glossolepis leggetti G. R. Allen & Renyaan, 1998 (Leggett's rainbowfish)
 Glossolepis maculosus G. R. Allen, 1981 (Spotted rainbowfish)
 Glossolepis multisquamata (M. C. W. Weber & de Beaufort, 1922) (Sepik rainbowfish)
 Glossolepis pseudoincisus G. R. Allen & N. J. Cross, 1980 (Tami River rainbowfish)
 Glossolepis ramuensis G. R. Allen, 1985 (Ramu rainbowfish)
 Glossolepis wanamensis G. R. Allen & Kailola, 1979 (Lake Wanam rainbowfish)

References

 
Melanotaeniinae